Hiroshi Tanaka is the name of

, Japanese high jumper
 Hiroshi Tanaka (mathematician) (born 1931), Japanese mathematician
, Japanese field hockey player
  (born 1970), Japanese manga artist
, Japanese figure skater
Hiroshi Tanaka (1934 - 1993), Japanese Actor